Antal Bolvári (May 6, 1932 – January 8, 2019) was a Hungarian water polo player who competed in the 1952 Summer Olympics and in the 1956 Summer Olympics.

Early life 
Born in Kaposvár, Bolvári was part of the Hungarian team that won the gold medal in the 1952 Olympics in Helsinki. He played in six matches and scored one goal.

Four years later, at the Melbourne Olympics, he was again a member of the Hungarian team that won the gold medal. He played in four matches and scored two goals, including one in the infamous Blood in the Water match against the USSR in the championship round, held a few weeks after the Soviets had crushed the 1956 Hungarian uprising.

Bolvári was one of several Hungarian athletes who defected to the West in the aftermath of the Melbourne games. He later returned to Hungary, where he continued to play and, later, coach at the club and national levels. He died in Budapest on January 8, 2019, as a result of a "a long, undisclosed illness", according to his family members.

See also
 Hungary men's Olympic water polo team records and statistics
 List of Olympic champions in men's water polo
 List of Olympic medalists in water polo (men)
 Blood in the Water match

References

External links
 

1932 births
2019 deaths
Hungarian male water polo players
Olympic water polo players of Hungary
Water polo players at the 1952 Summer Olympics
Water polo players at the 1956 Summer Olympics
Olympic gold medalists for Hungary
People from Kaposvár
Olympic medalists in water polo
Medalists at the 1956 Summer Olympics
Medalists at the 1952 Summer Olympics
Hungarian defectors
Sportspeople from Somogy County